Dnyaneshwar Vidyapeeth Trust (DVT) is former open university in Pune, Maharashtra. It was founded by Dr. M. D. Apte in 1980 and registered as "Educational Trust". under the Registration of Societies Act, 1860 and a Public Trust registered under the Bombay Public Trust Act, 1960.

It is not a university under UGC act. The Bombay High court had in a 2005 order, said that Dnyaneshwar Vidyapeeth does not have any rights to award degrees, and that the degrees issued even before 2005 were invalid.

Manohar Joshi was chancellor of the organisation in 2003 but later the post of chancellor was abolished.

DVT used to run 33 franchises colleges across Maharashtra and Karnataka and offered diploma and degree courses in engineering. Nearly 5,000 students enrolled every year at annual fees from Rs 22,000 to Rs 25,000. It ceased operations after a High Court order following a public interest litigation (PIL).

Controversy
In 2015, then Maharashtra Education Minister Vinod Tawde's name came in the limelight concerning an unrecognised engineering degree obtained from DVT.

Similarly, in 2020, Maharashtra Higher Education Minister Uday Samant's degree from the unrecognised institute called into question.

References

Education in Pune
Unaccredited institutions of higher learning in India